Burghclere is a village and civil parish in Hampshire, England. According to the 2011 census the village had a population of 1,152. The village is near the border of Hampshire with Berkshire, four miles south of Newbury. It is also very close to Newtown and Old Burghclere.

Work by the 20th-century artist Stanley Spencer can be found in the Sandham Memorial Chapel. The Church of the Ascension is on Church Lane in Burghclere.

Community 
There are community clubs such as Stagecoach Newbury which is held at The Clere School, and there is a Sports and Social club. There are allotments, and a small memorial garden. In addition, there is a large playing field.

Transport
The nearest railway station is Newbury. Burghclere had its own station on the Didcot, Newbury and Southampton Railway but the station closed in 1960. Limited bus services to Newbury are provided by Stagecoach route 7A (as of March 2019).

Education
Burghclere has three schools, the Clere School which is a secondary school, Burghclere Primary School and the independent St. Michael's School, which accepts both boarding and day pupils.

Rural scenery 
Burghclere has some beautiful rural scenery, so you can walk along the old railway, through many fields, or go for a hike. In the winter time, if it snows, Beacon Hill, or Jacob's Ladder, are where many young people and older people gather for snowballing or sledging.

Literature
The rabbit warren where Cowslip lived in Richard Adams' Watership Down was in High Wood, just north-east of Burghclere village.

In the book Rural Rides published by William Cobbett in 1822 the name of the village was recorded as Berghclere.

See also 
 Beacon Hill, a nearby hill fort

References

External links 

 Burghclere.net
 Burghclere Primary School
 GENUKI historical gazetteer information

Villages in Hampshire
Civil parishes in Basingstoke and Deane